Cendres de lune is the first album by the French singer/songwriter Mylène Farmer, released on 1 April 1986. The album was preceded by the hit single "Libertine". The album was rereleased in 1987, preceded by the song "Tristana". The album, which was Farmer's only one written and composed by Laurent Boutonnat, achieved success in France. Despite this success, it is considered moderate when compared with Farmer's standards and her later high-selling albums, but it helped to launch her career.

Background 
After the moderate success of the first four singles ("Maman a tort", "My Mum Is Wrong" [the English-language version of "Maman a tort"], "On est tous des imbéciles" and "Plus grandir"), Farmer decided to release her first album. At the time, she had signed a contract for two albums with the recording company Polydor, which reserved the right to break the contract at any time. Fortunately, in 1986, the success of "Libertine" brought Farmer her first big hit and allowed her to produce Cendres de lune.

The vinyl release of the album contained only nine tracks, including "Maman a tort", "Plus grandir" and its B-side "Chloé", plus six other songs. Polydor did not procure the copyright for "My Mum Is Wrong", "On est tous des imbéciles" and its B-side "L'Annonciation" from RCA, the label Farmer released those tracks on. However, in 1987, with the increasingly prominence of the Compact Disc, the album was reissued with a total of 12 titles: "Tristana", the 1987 hit written by Farmer, and two remixes ("Libertine" [remix special club], "Tristana" [remix club]) were added to the track listing. The second and further cassette releases comprise ten songs, including "Tristana", but missing the two remixes.

The album was also released in Canada and Germany. The cover, in black and white, was produced by Laurent Boutonnat and shows Farmer in profile, apparently sad, putting on a hat.

Lyrics and music 
The lyrics were written by Laurent Boutonnat who claimed to have had difficulty in composing them. However, "Plus grandir", "Tristana" and "Au Bout de la nuit" were written by Farmer herself (from "Tristana" onwards, she wrote all the lyrics of her songs), and "Maman a tort" by Jérôme Dahan. Generally, the lyrics deal with themes that would recur in Farmer's future albums, namely death, violence, suicide, sexuality, sadness and fear of aging. Therefore, the bases of the singer's universe were laid with this first album whose darkness contrasted greatly with the optimistic songs of the time.

Except for "Maman a tort" and "Libertine", the music was produced by Laurent Boutonnat who used mostly synthesizers and acoustic keyboards and was inspired by the new wave.

Critical reception 

Cendres de lune was generally well received by critics. It was considered as an "excellent" album (Gaipied), a "success" (Podium), "a first album rather masterly" (La Provence), "in the area of the variety, one of the most beautiful things of the moment" (Les Gran). "Full of little marvels" (Charente), it contains "hits having an wholesome impertinence" (Télé Poche) and "provides a real insight of [Farmer]'s talent"; [the singer] carries us with her crystalline voice and strange texts, out of time and out of the standards" (Le Républicain). "The songs of Mylène fill the air with an atmosphere alternately naughty and sad but very engaging" (7 à Paris). "Mylène's voice is exquisite and her accomplices made her sing little ordinary things" (La Dépêche). "[Farmer] seduces with sensitive texts, almost surreal, tenderly erotic" (Le Télégramme).

Commercial performance 
In France, Cendres de lune charted for the first time in April 1989, after the success of the second album, Ainsi soit je.... It peaked at number 39.

Track listing 

Note
1 Only on the second edition of the album

Personnel 

 Text:
 "Au Bout de la nuit", "Tristana", "Plus grandir": Mylène Farmer
 "Libertine", "Vieux Bouc", "Chloé", "We'll Never Die", "Greta": Laurent Boutonnat
 "Maman a tort": Jérôme Dahan
 Music: Laurent Boutonnat
Except "Libertine": Jean-Claude Déquéant; "Maman a tort": Jérôme Dahan & Laurent Boutonnat
 Sound: Jean-Claude Déquéant
 Mixed by Jean-Claude Déquéant
Except "Tristana": Thierry Rogen
 Assistant: Philippe Laffont, Laurent Lazahie
 Synthesizers and acoustic keyboards: Laurent Boutonnat
 Guitars: Slim Pezin
 Saxophone: Alain Matot
 Drums: Gilles Chamard

 Background vocals: Carole Frédéricks, Estella Samantha Radji, Anne-Marie Constant, Yvonne Jones, Les Moines Fous du Tibet
 Mastering and engraving: André Perriat
 Editions: Bertrand Le Page, Polygram Music
Except: "Maman a tort": Bertrand Le Page Cesanie; "Greta": Bertrand Le Page, Movie Box Music
 Photo on the first side and in the booklet: Laurent Boutonnat, Christophe Mourthe
 Photo on the back: Éric Caro
 Management: Bertrand Le Page
 Recorded at "Le Matin calme" studio
 Mixed at studio of the Palais des Congrès
 Produced by Laurent Boutonnat

Charts

Weekly charts

Year-end charts

Releases

Formats 
 12" (first version)1
 12" (second version)
 CD (first edition)1
 CD (second edition)
 Cassette (first edition)1
 Cassette (second edition)
 CD - Digipack (released in 2005)
 Picture Disc (released in 2013)
1 9 songs, without "Tristana" and the two remixes

References 

1986 debut albums
Mylène Farmer albums
Polydor Records albums